The Battle of Camerinum in 295 BC was a battle of the Third Samnite War. In the battle, the Semnones defeated a Roman legion under the command of the propraetor Lucius Cornelius Scipio Barbatus.

References

Camerinum
Camerinum
Camerinum
298 BC
Camerinum
3rd century BC in the Roman Republic
Camerino